Kelvin Belcher (September 20, 1961 – February 18, 2017) was an American professional tennis player.

Biography

Early years
Born in Gadsden, Alabama, Belcher was the son of parents who were both teachers. His father Leon is a professor of psychology and his mother worked as an English teacher. He grew up in Houston, attending Lamar High School.

Tennis career
Belcher played collegiate tennis while at Jackson State University, winning multiple Southwestern Athletic Conference singles titles, before transferring to Texas Southern University, where he graduated in 1983.

At the 1984 US Open he qualified for the main draw and made the second round, with a win over Leif Shiras, who was ranked 39 in the world at the time.

In 1984 and 1985 he featured on the Grand Prix circuit.

Later life
Following his tennis career he went to medical school at the University of Texas center in Houston and graduated with an M.D. in 1991, later working as a physician.

He died suddenly on February 18, 2017, at the age of 55, while playing a game of golf in Atlanta.

References

External links
 
 

1961 births
2017 deaths
American male tennis players
Tennis players from Houston
Jackson State Tigers and Lady Tigers
Texas Southern University alumni
University of Texas Health Science Center at Houston alumni
College men's tennis players in the United States